James Kelley Yarbrough (born October 28, 1946) is an American former college and professional football player who was an offensive lineman in the National Football League (NFL) for nine seasons during the 1960s and 1970s.  Yarbrough played college football for the University of Florida.  A second-round pick in the 1969 NFL Draft, he played his entire professional career for the NFL's Detroit Lions.

Early years 

Yarbrough was born in Charlotte, North Carolina.  He grew up in Arcadia, Florida, where he attended DeSoto County High School, and played high school football for the DeSoto Bulldogs.  Yarbrough was an offensive end, doubled on defense as a roving "monster man" linebacker, and also kicked most of the extra points for the Bulldogs.  He was also a shot-putter on the DeSoto County High School track team and center on the basketball team.

College career 

Yarbrough accepted an athletic scholarship to attend the University of Florida in Gainesville, Florida, where he played for coach Ray Graves' Florida Gators football team from 1966 to 1968.  He was a sophomore starter for the Steve Spurrier-led squad that won the first major bowl game in Gators history when they defeated the Georgia Tech Yellow Jackets 27–12 to win the 1967 Orange Bowl.

Yarbrough returned to Florida during the NFL off-season to complete his bachelor's degree in marketing in 1971, and he was later inducted into the University of Florida Athletic Hall of Fame as a "Gator Great."  In a 2006 article series written for The Gainesville Sun, he was ranked among the 100 greatest Gator football players of all time (No. 98). In the fall of 1999 Yarbrough was named as the Tight End on the Gators All-Century team as chosen by Gator fans and organized by the Gainesville Sun.

Professional career 

He became a regular starter at left tackle in his third season, 1971.

See also 

 Florida Gators football, 1960–69
 List of Detroit Lions players
 List of Florida Gators in the NFL Draft
 List of University of Florida alumni
 List of University of Florida Athletic Hall of Fame members

References

Bibliography 

 Carlson, Norm, University of Florida Football Vault: The History of the Florida Gators, Whitman Publishing, LLC, Atlanta, Georgia (2007).  .
 Golenbock, Peter, Go Gators!  An Oral History of Florida's Pursuit of Gridiron Glory, Legends Publishing, LLC, St. Petersburg, Florida (2002).  .
 Hairston, Jack, Tales from the Gator Swamp: A Collection of the Greatest Gator Stories Ever Told, Sports Publishing, LLC, Champaign, Illinois (2002).  .
 McCarthy, Kevin M.,  Fightin' Gators: A History of University of Florida Football, Arcadia Publishing, Mount Pleasant, South Carolina (2000).  .
 McEwen, Tom, The Gators: A Story of Florida Football, The Strode Publishers, Huntsville, Alabama (1974).  .
 Nash, Noel, ed., The Gainesville Sun Presents The Greatest Moments in Florida Gators Football, Sports Publishing, Inc., Champaign, Illinois (1998).  .

1946 births
Living people
American football offensive tackles
Detroit Lions players
Florida Gators football players
People from Arcadia, Florida
DeSoto County High School alumni
Players of American football from Florida
Players of American football from Charlotte, North Carolina